Jeanne Van Kesteren (born 25 December 1907, date of death unknown) was a Belgian athlete. She competed in the women's javelin throw at the 1936 Summer Olympics.

References

1907 births
Year of death missing
Athletes (track and field) at the 1936 Summer Olympics
Belgian female javelin throwers
Olympic athletes of Belgium
Place of birth missing